Thuringian is an East Central German dialect group spoken in much of the modern German Free State of Thuringia north of the Rennsteig ridge, southwestern Saxony-Anhalt and adjacent territories of Hesse and Bavaria. It is close to Upper Saxon spoken mainly in the state of Saxony, therefore both are also regarded as one Thuringian-Upper Saxon dialect group. Thuringian dialects are among the Central German dialects with the highest number of speakers.

History
Thuringian emerged during the medieval German Ostsiedlung migration from about 1100, when settlers from Franconia (Main Franconia), Bavaria, Saxony, and Flanders settled in the areas east of the Saale River previously inhabited by Polabian Slavs.

Characteristics
The Thuringian dialect is characterized by a rounding of the vowels, the weakening of consonants of Standard German (the lenition of the consonants "p," "t," and "k"), a marked difference in the pronunciation of the "g" sound (which is most common in the areas of North Thuringia and Saxony-Anhalt areas), and a highly-idiosyncratic, melodic intonation of sentences. The second German consonant shift manifested itself in a manner different from that elsewhere in the areas that spoke High German. In many words, "b" is pronounced as "w" or "f" would be in Standard German. For example, the word "aber" (but) is pronounced as "awer". The Thuringian dialect has advanced beyond the stage of basilect.

Classification 

Grouping according to German dialectology:
  (East Middle German, East Central German)
  (Thuringian)
  (Central Thuringian)
  (West Thuringian)
  (East Thuringian)
  (North Thuringian)
 
 
 
 

Another way to subdivide it is:
  / Thuringian
  / North Thuringian: around Mühlhausen and Nordhausen
 : in Eichsfeld
  / North-east Thuringian: spoken around Artern as well as in the adjacent areas of Querfurt, Halle and Merseburg of Saxony-Anhalt
 : in Mansfeld
  / West Thuringian: around Bad Salzungen and Eisenach, with transitions into the East Franconian (Henneberg) and (East) Hessian dialect area
  / Central Thuringian: spoken around the Turingian capital Erfurt, Gotha, and Ilmenau
  / Ilm Thuringian: around Rudolstadt, Jena, and Weimar
  / East Thuringian: spoken around Eisenberg and Altenburg as well as in the adjacent area of Naumburg, Weissenfels and Zeitz in Saxony-Anhalt
  / South-east Thuringian: around Schleiz, Greiz, Saalfeld and Gera, as well as around Ludwigsstadt in neighbouring Bavaria

References

Central German languages
German dialects
Languages of Germany
Thuringia